Book of Roses is the eighth studio album by Swiss harpist and new-age artist Andreas Vollenweider, released in 1991. It is almost entirely instrumental.

Track listing
 "La Strega (Her Journey to the Grand Ball)" – 1:03
 "The Grand Ball Of The Duljas" – 1:46
 "Morning At Boma Park" – 3:15
 "The Five Curtains" – 1:43
 "Book Of Roses" – 3:30
 "In Doga Gamee" – 4:40
 "Passage To Promise" – 2:27
 "In The Woods Of Kroandal" – 3:12
 "Jugglers In Osidian" – 3:28
 "Chanson De L'Heure Bleue" – 1:34
 "Czippa And The Ursanian Girl" – 3:11
 "The Birds Of Tilmun" – 2:09
 "Hirzel" – 5:13
 "Jours D'Amour" – 3:56
 "Manto's Arrow And The Sphynx" – 2:34
 "Letters To A Young Rose" – 5:06

Personnel

  Andreas Vollenweider – harp, vocals, keyboards, flute, chinese bamboo, dulcimer, erhu, orchestral percussion, acoustic, classical, 12-strings and electric guitar, piano, crumhorn, bassoon, kora
 Sainkho Namtchylak – vocals on "La Strega (Her Journey To The Grand Ball)", "The Birds Of Tilmun", "Manto's Arrow And The Sphinx" and "Letters To A Young Rose"
 Corin Curschellas – vocals on "Czippa And The Ursanian Girl" and "Jours D'Amour"
 Matthias Ziegler – flute on "Chanson De L'Heure Bleue" and "The Birds Of Tilmun"
 Ladysmith Black Mambazo – choir on "Passage To Promise"
 Marilyn Mazur – percussion on "Hirzel"
 Gerardo Nuñez – Spanish guitar on "Jugglers In Obsidian"
 Basel Sinfonietta – orchestra on "La Strega (Her Journey To The Grand Ball)" and "In The Woods Of Kroandal". conductor: Andres Joho
 Dodo Hug,  Regina Günthard, Sue Mathys – vocals on "The Grand Ball Of The Duljas", "Morning At The Boma Park", and "In Doga Gamee". 
 Christian M. Siegmann – Bassoon on "The Grand Ball Of The Duljas" and "Book of Roses"
 Daniel Pezzotti – Cello on "The Grand Ball Of The Duljas" and "Chanson De L'Heure Bleue"
 Max Lässer – acoustic guitar
 Thomas Fessler – charango, electric guitar, sitar, pipa
 Walter Keiser – drums
 Pedro Haldemann – drums, percussion, vocals
 Santino Famulari – piano on "Morning At The Boma Park"; Piano and  Accordion on "Letters To A Young Rose".
 Peter Kaiser – arco bass
 Roman Schmid – English horn
 Hans-Peter Hass – trombone
 Hugo Helfenstein – bass trombone
 Roland Van Straate – harmonica
 Sandro Friedrich – Fujara (Czechoslovakian Shepherd's Flute) on "In The Woods Of Kroandal"
 Carmen Cortes and Guadiana (Antonio Suárez Salazar) – Handclaps on "Jugglers In Obsidian"
 Cristoph Stiefel – keyboards
 Hans Hassler – accordion
 Vali Mayer – acoustic bass
 Heiri Känzig – acoustic bass
 Silver Symphony Orchestra & Choir – choir
 The Silver Brass Ensemble
 Bulgarian Men's Choir – vocals on "Jours D'Amour". Choir: Andrzej Poraszka, Angel Petkov, Assen Toschef, Gerassim Gerassimov, György Antalffy, Jvaylo Jvanov, Sacho Jelev, Tadeusz Tomaszczuk

References

Andreas Vollenweider albums
1991 albums